KJOK (102.7 FM) is a radio station licensed to Hollis, Oklahoma. The station broadcasts a Classic rock format and is owned by Monte Spearman and Gentry Todd Spearman, through licensee High Plains Radio Network, LLC.

References

External links
KJOK's official website

JOK
Classic rock radio stations in the United States
Radio stations established in 2013
2013 establishments in Oklahoma